The Ukrainian Museum in New York City is the largest museum of its kind outside of Ukraine and is dedicated to the enjoyment, understanding, and preservation of the artistic and cultural heritage of Ukraine. For centuries Ukraine has been an epicenter for creative output — from traditional music, dance, and folk art to the birthplace of modern art and cinema. Today, the country celebrates its cultural impact on the world for people of all backgrounds. The museum's building was designed by Ukrainian-American architect George Sawicki of Sawicki Tarella Architecture + Design in New York City, and was funded by the Ukrainian-American community. The museum is located at 222 East 6th Street between Second Avenue and Cooper Square in the East Village neighborhood of Manhattan.

The museum's collection falls into three primary groupings, "folk art", which includes festive and ritual attire and other items of clothing, ceramics, metalwork and carved wood items, as well as Ukrainian Easter eggs (pysanky); "fine arts", including paintings, drawings, sculptures and graphic works by noted Ukrainian artists such as the primitive artist Nikifor, Mykhailo Moroz, Vasyl Hryhorovych Krychevsky, Mykhailo Chereshnovsky, Alexander Archipenko, Peter Kapschutschenko, Alexis Gritchenko, Oleksa Nowakiwsky, Ivan Trush, Jacques Hnizdovsky, Liuboslaw Hutsaliuk, and Edward Kozak, among many others; and items documenting the history and cultural legacy of  Ukrainian immigration to the United States, including photographs, personal correspondence, posters, flyers and playbills, stamps and coins.

References

External links

Official website

Museums of Ukrainian culture abroad
Ethnic museums in New York City
Arts organizations of the Ukrainian diaspora
Society museums in New York (state)
Folk art museums and galleries in New York (state)
Art museums and galleries in New York City
Museums in Manhattan
Ukrainian museums in the United States
Ukrainian-American culture in New York City
Art museums established in 1976
1976 establishments in New York City